RxAll Inc. is a health information technology/big data startup company. The company works with drug regulatory agencies and other stakeholders to reduce fake medicines and make sure that patients receive high quality verified drugs, and help pharma manufacturers gain more sales, and patients have better access to high quality drugs.

Founding history
RxAll Inc. was established on January 1, 2016 by Adebayo Alonge, Amy Kao and Wei Liu. They were graduate students of Yale University - Yale School of Management at the time. It is seen as an important weapon against illegal pharmaceutical outfits in Kenya.  Alonge was nearly killed by fake salbutamol tablets in Nigeria in 2005.

Early challenges
Like many start-ups, RxAll Inc. came up against early challenges when it almost ran out of cash in the first quarter of 2017, the founding team persisted to raise funds in parallel to operating the business. Co-founders Adebayo Alonge and Amy Kao managed to raise about $1 million in grants and bootstrapped funds from the Nigerian government, the Yale start-up ecosystem, Merck, Villgro and other support networks.

Products
The company's products are:

RxScanner
RxScanner is an handheld drug authenticator device created for patients to verify their drugs and help drug regulators to reduce administrative burden, improve record keeping and also improved productivity and successful prosecution of bad actors. The device is in use by country FDAs, Hospitals, Pharmacies and Big Pharma across the world.

RxAll POS
RxAll POS is a Point of sale software created for Pharmacies in growth market that enables complete automation of the pharmacy management system.

RxAll Delivered
RxAll Delivered is a drug delivery platform that enable pharmacies and patients order verified drugs online for offline delivery at wholesale prices.

The company gained market entry into East Africa (Kenya and Uganda), West Africa (Nigeria and Ghana), Southeast Asia (Myanmar, Malaysia and Singapore), and the Americas (Canada, United States and Colombia).

Award
RxAll Inc. won the 2019 BNP Paribas group deep tech award otherwise known as Hello Tomorrow, a competition crafted for tech innovators and entrepreneurs, worth €100,000.

Also, the company was the recipient of 2018 CIO Review Most Promising PharmaTech Vendor Award and 2018 Katapult FutureFest's Glstart-up award in Oslo, Norway.

External links
RxAll Inc. Website

References

Privately held companies based in Connecticut
2016 establishments in Connecticut
Medical technology companies of the United States
Biotechnology companies of the United States
Biotechnology companies established in 2016
Software companies of the United States
Software companies based in Connecticut
Multinational companies headquartered in the United States
American companies established in 2016
Software companies established in 2016